Hegon Henrique Martins de Andrade, known as Hegon (born May 6, 1988 in Palhoça), is a Brazilian footballer, who plays as an attacking midfielder for Guarani SC.

Career
It was in the youth team at  Avaí that Hegon first came to prominence winning a Catarinense Junior Championship title in 2005. He turned professional in 2008.

Not many chances in the squad's team of Florianopolis in the year when the club returned to the elite of Brazilian football, even by the young, was lent to the Metropolitan Hegon to compete in the state in 2009. That same year, the Avaí sees an opportunity to not leave the house stopped the silver and yet again to borrow from the Guarani Palhoça (his hometown).

In 2010, Hegon back to compose the cast of Avaí but not for long. In July the player is announced as the newest building of the Union St. John Still in the same year he returned to work in the Avaí Cup Sub23.

From 2011 to 2013, he played for Asteras Tripolis in the Superleague Greece and from 2013 to 2014 he played for Apollon Smyrni.

Career statistics
(Correct )

Honours
Avaí
Campeonato Catarinense: 2010

Asteras Tripolis
Greek Cup: runner-up 2013

References

External links
 ogol.com
 Hegon at srbijafudbal.com
 Hegon at ZeroZero

1988 births
Living people
Brazilian footballers
Brazilian expatriate footballers
Avaí FC players
Clube Atlético Metropolitano players
União São João Esporte Clube players
Criciúma Esporte Clube players
Camboriú Futebol Clube players
Campeonato Brasileiro Série A players
Expatriate footballers in Mexico
Asteras Tripolis F.C. players
Apollon Smyrnis F.C. players
Super League Greece players
Expatriate footballers in Greece
FK Jagodina players
Guarani de Palhoça players
Serbian First League players
Expatriate footballers in Serbia
Association football midfielders